Mother Goose in Prose is a collection of twenty-two children's stories based on Mother Goose nursery rhymes. It was the first children's book written by L. Frank Baum, and the first book illustrated by Maxfield Parrish.  It was originally published in 1897 by Way and Williams of Chicago, and re-released by the George M. Hill Company in 1901.

Contents
The book opens with an introduction by Baum that traces the history of Mother Goose.  It is followed by the original text of a nursery rhyme with a broader story to establish its literary context.

Sing a Song o' Sixpence
The Story of Little Boy Blue
The Cat and the Fiddle
Black Sheep
Old King Cole
Mistress Mary
The Wond'rous Wise Man
What Jack Horner Did
The Man in the Moon
The Jolly Miller
The Little Man and His Little Gun
Hickory, Dickory, Dock
Little Bo-Peep
The Story of Tommy Tucker
Pussy-cat Mew
How the Beggars Came to Town
Tom, Tom, the Piper's Son
Humpty Dumpty
The Woman Who Lived in a Shoe
Little Miss Muffet
Three Wise Men of Gotham
Little Bun Rabbit

The book's last selection features a girl named Dorothy who can talk to animals—an anticipation of the Oz books. When Baum later included this story in his Juvenile Speaker (1910) and The Snuggle Tales (1916–17), he changed the girl's name to Doris, to avoid confusing her with Dorothy Gale.

Though handsomely produced, Mother Goose in Prose was priced relatively expensively for a children's book; it was "only moderately successful" commercially. Publisher Way and Williams went bankrupt a year later. Baum took a different approach in a subsequent venture, composing original verses for his Father Goose: His Book in 1899.

Later editions
New editions of Mother Goose in Prose appeared from Bounty Books in 1951 and after, Dover Publications in 2002, and Kessinger Publishing in 2004, among others.

The Jim Henson Company made a TV series based on the book called Jim Henson's Mother Goose Stories.

References

External links 

 
 

1897 books
1897 short story collections
Collections of nursery rhymes
Books by L. Frank Baum
Children's short story collections
Fantasy short story collections
Works based on nursery rhymes
1890s children's books
Books about cats
American children's books